Harmer Hill is a village in Shropshire, England located on the A528 south of Wem and north of Shrewsbury.

The name Harmer comes from the two words  "hare" and "mere", as there was a lake situated in a plain below the hill, but it was drained in the 15th century for farm land. The village was home to two pubs, the Bridgewater Arms and the Red Castle; the Red Castle closed in 2018. There is a village hall and Presbyterian chapel with its own burial ground. Harmer Hill is said to be haunted, notably by a "White Lady".

Queen Mary's brother, the Marquess of Cambridge, lived at nearby Shotton Hall from after World War I until his death in 1927.
Helen Morgan, Liberal Democrat MP, lives in Harmer Hill, which is in her North Shropshire constituency.

See also
Listed buildings in Myddle and Broughton

References

External links

Villages in Shropshire